Adaora Nnenna Elonu (born 28 April 1990) is a Nigerian-American professional basketball player and a member of the Nigeria women's national team. Elonu played college basketball for Texas A&M, with whom she won the 2011 NCAA Championship.

Texas A&M statistics

Source

Club career
In 2012, she went overseas, playing one season in Israel for Hapoel Galil Elyon, after which she signed in Spain with Beroil–Ciudad de Burgos. After the team disbanded, she signed for CB Conquero with whom she won the 2016 Copa de la Reina, being selected as the tournament's MVP. Despite not playing several games with the club due to lack of payment of her wages, she likewise finished the regular season with the highest efficiency ranking. Subsequently, she signed for Spanish champion CB Avenida for season 2016–17.she averaged 9.9ppg, 4.3rpg, 1.8apg and 1.5spg. She helped them to win the Supercup and end the regular season at the top position

On 10 August 2018, she signed with the WNBA side Atlanta Dream on a seven-day contract.

Elonu moved to Spanish side Uni Girona CB in August, 2019. she won Most Valuable Player (MVP) as Uni Girona, defeated Perfumerías Avenida 82-80 points to lift the Spanish Super Cup at the Fontajau in September, 2019.

She started the 2021–2022 season with Nadezhda Orenburg of the Russian PBL league but left the club following the 2022 Russian invasion of Ukraine. Shortly later she returned to Spain and signed with CB Avenida.

WNBA career statistics

Regular season

|-
| align="left" | 2018
| align="left" | Atlanta
| 1 || 0 || 1.0 || .000 || .000 || .000 || 0.0 || 0.0 || 0.0 || 0.0 || 0.0 || 0.0
|-
| align="left" | Career
| align="left" | 1 year, 1 team
| 1 || 0 || 1.0 || .000 || .000 || .000 || 0.0 || 0.0 || 0.0 || 0.0 || 0.0 || 0.0

International career
Elonu has played with the Nigerian's national team with whom she achieved the bronze medal in the AfroBasket Women 2015, being elected as part of the tournament's All-Star Five.
She was part of the Nigerian side that won gold at the Afrobasket 2017 championship in Mali. She averaged the team's high 3.9 assists per game. She was also a member of the tournament's top ten players. Elonu emerged captain of the Nigeria Women's National Basketball Team on 10 August while the team camped in Atlanta in preparation for the 2018 FIBA Women's World Cup. During the 2018 FIBA Women's Basketball World Cup, she averaged 7.4 points, 4.6 rebounds and 2.1 assists per game.
She also participated in the 2021 FIBA women's Afrobasket basketball tournament in Cameroon, as the captain of the team, clinching the title. She was named the tournament's Most Valuable Player (MVP).

Personal life
Adaora Elonu is sister to also professional basketball player Chinemelu Elonu.

Awards and accomplishments

Club
 2011: 2011 NCAA Championship
 2016: Spanish Cup (being named Tournament MVP)
 2019: Spanish Cup (being named Tournament MVP)

National team
 2015: Bronze Medal at AfroBasket Women 2015 (named in the tournament's All-Star Five)
 2017: Gold Medal at AfroBasket Women 2017 
 2019: Gold Medal at AfroBasket Women 2019 
 2021: Gold Medal at AfroBasket Women 2021 (named the tournament's Most Valuable Player)

References

External links
 Profile in FEB.es
 Afrobasket 2015 Profile in fiba.com
 
 
 

Living people
1990 births
Basketball players from Texas
Forwards (basketball)
Hapoel Galil Elyon players
Nigerian women's basketball players
American women's basketball players
Basketball players from Houston
Texas A&M Aggies women's basketball players
African Games silver medalists for Nigeria
African Games medalists in basketball
American expatriate basketball people in Spain
Nigerian expatriate basketball people in Spain
Competitors at the 2015 African Games
Igbo sportspeople
Basketball players at the 2020 Summer Olympics
Olympic basketball players of Nigeria
Citizens of Nigeria through descent
African-American basketball players
Nigerian people of African-American descent
American emigrants to Nigeria
American sportspeople of Nigerian descent
21st-century African-American sportspeople
21st-century American women